Apatadelpha is a genus of moths in the family Geometridae.

Desmobathrinae
Geometridae genera